Suhaag is a 1979 Indian Hindi-language action drama film directed by Manmohan Desai, and written by Kader Khan, Prayag Raj and K.K. Shukla. The movie stars Shashi Kapoor, Amitabh Bachchan, Rekha and Parveen Babi in lead roles, with Amjad Khan, Nirupa Roy, Kader Khan, Ranjeet and Jeevan in supporting roles. The music was composed by Laxmikant Pyarelal.

A huge box office success, the film became the highest-grossing film of 1979. The film was remade in Telugu as Satyam Sivam with N. T. Rama Rao & Akkineni Nageswara Rao.

Plot
Durga (Nirupa Roy) and Vikram Kapoor (Amjad Khan) have been married for years.  Vikram has taken to crime in a big way and as a result has antagonized a rival gangster, Jaggi (Kader Khan),Durga gives birth to twins and Jaggi steals one of them, and sells him to a bootlegger, Pascal. Durga is upset when she finds her son missing, but is devastated when Vikram abandons her.  With a lot of difficulties, Durga brings up her son, Kishan (Shashi Kapoor), and has given up on finding her other son.  Kishan has grown up and is now a dedicated police officer. On the other hand, Pascal has exploited Amit (Amitabh Bachchan), educated, and made him a petty criminal and alcoholic. This gets him in a confrontation with Kishan but the two settle their differences and become fast friends. Vikram is not aware of his two sons and wife being alive. Without revealing his identity, he hires Amit to kill Kishan during a Navratri dance at Maa Sherawali's temple. Amit informs Kishan and together with other police personnel, keep vigil. Things do not go as planned; they are attacked and Kishan loses his eyesight, leaving the onus on Amit to try to locate the person behind this crime. Full of singing, dancing, and stunts, the film has a strong moral undertone of good triumphing over evil despite any odds.

Cast

 Shashi Kapoor as Kishan Kapoor
 Amitabh Bachchan as Amit Kapoor
 Rekha as Basanti
 Parveen Babi as Anu
 Nirupa Roy as Durga Kapoor
 Amjad Khan as Vikram Kapoor
 Ranjeet as Gopal
 Kader Khan as Jaggi
 Jeevan as Pascal
 Jagdish Raj as Inspector Khan
 Krishan Dhawan as Lala sheth
 Master Titto as young Kishan
 Master Ratan as young Amit
 Moolchand as Marwadi seth Shop owner
 Vatsala Deshmukh as Jamnabai
 Komila Virk as glamorous girl in Gopal's bar

Soundtrack

The movie songs were great hits. Mohammed Rafi and Laxmikant–Pyarelal combo created popular songs. Mohammed Rafi's voice was used for Amitabh Bachchan and Shailendra Singh's voice for Shashi Kapoor. The songs of the movie are popular till today. 

After "Yeh Dosti Hum Nahin Todenge" by Kishore Kumar and Manna Dey from film Sholay, "Ae Yaar Sun Yaari Teri" is classified as most popular song of friendship song."Tere Rab Ne Bana Di Jodi" is played in most weddings and its like a must to play during the marriage occasion.

"Tere Rab Ne Bana Di Jodi" was directed in London's Hyde Park, with a UK Based Punjabi dance group from Southall.

References

External links
 

1979 films
Films directed by Manmohan Desai
Films scored by Laxmikant–Pyarelal
1970s Hindi-language films
Hindi films remade in other languages
Indian action drama films
1970s action drama films
1970s masala films